David Louis Blaney (born October 24, 1962) is a semi-retired American professional stock car racing driver. Blaney was a successful sprint car driver before he started racing in NASCAR, competing in both the Sprint Cup Series and Nationwide Series. For many years, he was a regular at Super Dirt Week in Syracuse, New York, although he never won that event. He owns Sharon Speedway in Hartford Township, Trumbull County, Ohio. His brother Dale Blaney is a sprint car driver. His son, Ryan Blaney, is also a NASCAR competitor.

Sprint car racing career

Blaney, born in Hartford Township in Trumbull County, Ohio, was awarded the 1983 All-Star Sprint Circuit Rookie-of-the-Year. He raced in the United States Automobile Club (USAC) Silver Crown Series in 1984 and won the national touring series' championship. Blaney won his first World of Outlaws (WoO) race at Eldora Speedway in 1987. He won the 1993 Chili Bowl Midget Nationals. In 1995 he won his second $50,000 to win King's Royal at Eldora Speedway on his way to winning the  WoO Championship. In the 1997 season, he won the Gold Cup, and the  Knoxville Nationals, which is considered the premiere event in sprint car racing. He was the first driver who did not defend his Knoxville win, when he moved into NASCAR. After moving to NASCAR, he kept his sprint car team going, fielding a car for his brother Dale and the late Kevin Gobrecht. In 2016 after retiring from NASCAR, he drove the Motter Motorsports 71M on a hand-picked schedule of primarily World of Outlaws and All-Star, along with races in central Pennsylvania.

In May 2021, Blaney won the World Of Outlaws sprint car feature race at his home track of Sharon Speedway, setting series records for both longest gap between victories—his previous win with the Outlaws came in 1997—and oldest driver to win in the series at 58 years old.

NASCAR career

1998–2005: Early career and team instability
Blaney began his Busch Series career in 1998 with Bill Davis Racing, driving the No. 93 Amoco-sponsored Pontiac and in his first season had three sixth-place finishes and a pole position at Lowe's Motor Speedway. The following season, he ran a full-time schedule and won four poles and ended the season a career-best seventh in points. That season, he returned to the Winston Cup series with Davis, earning a best finish of 23rd at Homestead in the No. 93.

In 2000, Blaney and his Amoco team moved up to Winston Cup full-time and posted two Top 10s, but DNQ’d in the second race of the season at Rockingham. He finished third in the NASCAR Winston Cup Rookie of the Year award standings for the season. He returned to the Busch Series that year with a limited schedule in BDR's No. 20 AT&T-sponsored Pontiac, gaining a pole position at Charlotte and also finish 3rd twice. In 2001, the team would switch to Dodge and he would compete in all the races with a best finish of sixth three different times during the season. He left Davis at the end of the season due to sponsorship concerns and signed with the No. 77 Jasper Motorsports team. His best finish during the 2002 season was seventh at Phoenix. Blaney started the 2003 season with three Top 10s and a pole the first five races, including a third-place finish at Darlington, but fell to 28th in points at the end of the season, forcing his release.

Blaney returned to Bill Davis Racing in 2004 for a limited schedule, due to a lack of a sponsorship. Part of his deal was making his Craftsman Truck Series debut for the team in the No. 23 at Dover, where he finished sixth. After two 11th-place finishes, Blaney joined Richard Childress Racing, taking over the No. 30 AOL-sponsored Chevrolet for eight races. After two Top 15 finishes, he was replaced by Jeff Burton and started one race for Roush Racing in the No. 99 Canteen Vending/Kraft Foods-sponsored Ford in the place of rookie Carl Edwards, who missed the start due a Craftsman Truck Series race that ran late. Blaney exited the car on lap 24, and Edwards went on to finish 37th after a crash. He also ran the spring race at Richmond International Raceway in the No. 7 Dodge for Ultra Motorsports and finished 40th.

Blaney returned to Richard Childress Racing in 2005 to drive the No. 07 Jack Daniel's-sponsored Chevrolet. During the season he would post only two Top 10 finishes and finished a dismal 26th in points.

2006–2008: Second Bill Davis Racing stint

In 2006, he returned to the Bill Davis Racing stable to run the No. 22 Caterpillar-sponsored Dodge. His best finish in 2006 came at the Richmond International Raceway, where he finished fourth. He also scored his first Busch Series victory at Lowes Motor Speedway, when Matt Kenseth spun on the last lap and Blaney was in the lead. In 2007, BDR switched to Toyota, which had just entered the Cup Series. Blaney failed to qualify for three races, but got Toyota its first Cup Series pole at Loudon, and finished 31st in points. In 2008, with the Car of Tomorrow being raced full-time, Blaney had two Top 10s and moved up to 30th in points.

2009–2010: Loss of Ride, Start, and Park Teams.

Bill Davis Racing shut down before the 2009 season, leaving Blaney without a ride.  In 2009, Blaney signed to run the start and park No. 66 Prism Motorsports Toyota for a full season, getting a best finish of 28th at Charlotte Motor Speedway. Incidentally, Blaney did not qualify for three out of the four races that he had sponsorship for (Hyde Park was on the car at Las Vegas, and the Denny Hamlin Foundation at Charlotte and Texas). With the team continuing to start and park during the 2010 season, Blaney has a best finish of 29th at Las Vegas and led three laps the previous week at Fontana, he has parked his car prior to completion in all but one race this season. For the race at Phoenix, Blaney piloted the No. 55 Prism Toyota, with teammate Michael McDowell driving the No. 66 in an attempt to get both teams in the Top 35 in owners points according to team owner Phil Parsons.

Throughout the summer of 2010, Blaney ran in dirt track 410 sprint car racing, and the "Buckeye Bullet" has been successful in his return posting two Top 5 finishes during Ohio Sprint Speedweek and has one feature win thus far as he was triumphant at TRI-CITY Speedway in Franklin Pennsylvania on July 4, 2010.

Blaney has his sights set on some major events during his summer dirt tour including a stop at family owned Sharon Speedway for the Lou Blaney Memorial and Eldora Speedway for the Kings Royal.

For the remainder of the 2010 Sprint Cup season, Blaney split his time between Front Row Motorsports and Tommy Baldwin Racing. Compared to Prism, both teams have some degree of sponsorship; Front Row Motorsports ran full races while Tommy Baldwin Racing was an occasional start and park entry. For example, Blaney ran the entire race at Loudon in the No. 36 with only associate sponsorship from Connecticut-based construction company Mohawk Northeast (owned by Alan Heinke, part owner of TBR) while parking an unsponsored TBR entry at Talladega after 12 laps.

2011–2013: Career revival with Tommy Baldwin
For the 2011 season, Blaney joined Tommy Baldwin Racing for the full season, with the team now committed to running full races. At the 2011 Daytona 500, Blaney received last minute sponsorship from Golden Corral. He led three laps and finished 26th after a late race accident. Blaney piloted the No. 36 Tommy Baldwin Racing Chevrolet with backing from Accell Construction Inc. in several races during the season. Golden Corral returned at the 2011 Aaron's 499, and Blaney led 21 laps but was spun out by Kurt Busch with three laps to go and finished 27th. He led the second most laps behind Clint Bowyer.

On April 27, Tommy Baldwin Racing announced that Blaney and the No. 36 team would be sponsored by Golden Corral for 19 races and Big Red / All Sport for five races leaving only three races without a sponsor. The team did not run the Sprint All-Star Race in May in order to focus on the points-paying events. Blaney finished third at Talladega in the fall, which was the best finish for Tommy Baldwin Racing and tied for his best career finish.

Golden Corral returned for three races in 2012, with Ollie's Bargain Outlet, Accell Construction and TMOne sponsoring other races. During the 2012 Daytona 500, Blaney led after 160 laps.  During a caution, shortly after race leaders had made pit stops, Juan Pablo Montoya crashed into a jet dryer, which was being used to blow debris from the track.  As a result of the crash, the jet fuel that powered the helicopter engine spilled out onto the track and was ignited.  NASCAR put the race under a red flag, at which point Blaney had the lead. Blaney finished 15th after a crash on lap 196.

Blaney returned to Tommy Baldwin Racing for the 2013 NASCAR Sprint Cup Series season, moving to the new No. 7 Chevrolet; he also signed with Brad Keselowski Racing to drive their No. 19 in the Camping World Truck Series at the series' inaugural visit to Eldora Speedway, which he drove to a ninth-place finish. With Blaney's son Ryan's career having reached a level in which it no longer needed family funding, Dave went into semi-retirement after 2013.  His last race with TBR was the season finale at Homestead.  He was replaced at TBR by rookie Michael Annett.  Blaney was credited with being a major part of building TBR into a legitimate Cup-level organization.

2014: Semi-retirement
In January 2014, it was announced that Blaney would be driving the No. 77 Ford for Randy Humphrey Racing during several 2014 races. However, during practice for the Daytona 500, Blaney's car was caught up in a wreck. The team attempted to purchase a backup car from another team, but was unable to, and was forced to rescind their entry. The team was on the entry list for the Auto Club 400, but the team withdrew the Tuesday before the race. The team was again on the entry list for the STP 500 at Martinsville Speedway, but withdrew before practice. After failing to qualify in their first four races, the No. 77 team qualified for the first time in 2014 at the Duck Commander 500. At the season's midway point, Humphrey's team suspended operations.

At the August race at Pocono, Blaney returned to TBR for the first time, driving a third car for the team he helped build. He finished 26th in the race. Blaney returned to the car at Michigan later in the month. Blaney also drove the following week at Bristol Motor Speedway, which turned out to be his final start.

Motorsports career results

NASCAR
(key) (Bold – Pole position awarded by qualifying time. Italics – Pole position earned by points standings or practice time. * – Most laps led.)

Sprint Cup Series

Daytona 500

Nationwide Series

Camping World Truck Series 

 Season still in progress
 Ineligible for series points

Superstar Racing Experience
(key) * – Most laps led. 1 – Heat 1 winner. 2 – Heat 2 winner.

Images

References

 NASCAR driver Blaney a reason racing is so popular

External links

Living people
1962 births
People from Trumbull County, Ohio
Racing drivers from Ohio
NASCAR drivers
ARCA Menards Series drivers
World of Outlaws drivers
Caterpillar Inc. people
Richard Childress Racing drivers
USAC Silver Crown Series drivers
RFK Racing drivers